Semanotus japonicus is a species of beetle in the family Cerambycidae.

The beetle occurs naturally on Honshu, Shikoku, Sado Island, Oki Island and Yaku Island in Japan. Its main host tree is the Japanese cedar, Cryptomeria japonica.

References

Callidiini
Beetles described in 1869